Farhad Kheirkhah (born 25 March 1984) is an Iranian footballer who plays as a striker for Khosheh Talaie Sana.

Club career
He joined Sorkhpooshan in 2005 and having only played 8 games in the Azadegan League, he managed to score 12 goals and become the top scorer. With the offers coming thick and fast from Iran's Premier Football League teams including the likes of Esteghlal and Sepahan he signed a 2-year contract with Persepolis FC.

Club career statistics

 Assist goals

Honours

Iran's Premier Football League Winner: 1
2007/08 with Persepolis

References

External links
 Farhad Kheirkhah's Interview in Navad

1984 births
Living people
People from Saveh
Iranian footballers
Association football forwards
Persepolis F.C. players
Tractor S.C. players
Shahrdari Tabriz players
Nassaji Mazandaran players
Persian Gulf Pro League players
Azadegan League players